QU Stadium is a stadium in Quincy, Illinois originally known as Q Stadium. It is primarily used for baseball, but also has a separate football field. The baseball side and football side of QU Stadium holds 2,500 people. The football side of the stadium (located beyond the right and right center field fence of the baseball field) only has bleachers on one side of the field. The stadium is surrounded by its original limestone wall built in 1938.

History
The stadium was built in 1938 as part of the Works Progress Administration (WPA) and originally owned by the City of Quincy. It is constructed of large limestone blocks and concrete.  A "sister" facility of limestone and concrete was built near Quincy High School (which was then located at 13th & Maine). This sister facility was the practice field for Quincy High School athletic teams until a new high school was built at 30th & Maine. At that time, the building at 13th & Maine became Quincy Junior High School and the athletic fields continued to be used by QJHS athletic teams.

In 1984, the city sold the stadium to Quincy College (later Quincy University), a local liberal-arts 4-year Roman Catholic college affiliated with the Order of Friars Minor (Franciscans). The name of the stadium was changed to QC stadium and then to QU stadium, after Quincy College changed its name to Quincy University.

Baseball history
The stadium has been home to the Quincy Gems of the Three-I League from 1946 to 1956. From 1960 to 1961 the Quincy Giants of the Midwest League (ML) played there. During the 1962 and 1963 seasons the Quincy Jets of the Midwest League, a New York Mets farm team, played their home games at the stadium and in 1964 another Quincy Gems team played at the stadium. From 1965 to 1973, the Quincy Cubs, a Chicago Cubs farm team, also of the Midwest League called Q Stadium home. The Quincy Rivermen of the Central Illinois Collegiate League (CICL) played at the stadium from 1974 to 1987. Since 1995, it has been the home of the Quincy University Hawks baseball team, while the Quincy Gems of both the CICL and Prospect League have played at the stadium since 1996.

Football history
The stadium was originally used for football by Quincy Senior High School and Quincy Notre Dame High School as their home football field until a new stadium was completed in 1980 (Flinn Stadium). Both schools, as well as Quincy College (later Quincy University), used the baseball side of the stadium for football.

After both high schools quit using the stadium for football, the Quincy YMCA Tackle Football League began using the football side for the 7th & 8th grade league.  The YMCA also used the field for two youth flag football leagues – a 2nd through 4th grade league, and a 5th & 6th grade league.  The Quincy Family YMCA completed a field on its property, so the tackle football and flag football leagues moved to that field in 1984.

In 1987, then Quincy College re-instated its football program after an over 30-year hiatus. The Hawks began using the football side of QC Stadium competing in NCAA Division III.  The Hawks moved up to NCAA Division II during the 1990s. In 2010, the football team moved to Flinn Stadium, but moved back to QU Stadium in 2014 after a major renovation.

References

External links 
 QU Stadium Website

American football venues in Illinois
Baseball venues in Illinois
Minor league baseball venues
Quincy Hawks baseball
Quincy Hawks football
Buildings and structures in Quincy, Illinois
Sports in Quincy, Illinois
1938 establishments in Illinois
College football venues
College baseball venues in the United States
Sports venues completed in 1938
Defunct Midwest League ballparks